South Prairie Construction Co. v. Local No 627, International Union of Operating Engineers, AFL-CIO, 425 U.S. 800 (1976), is a US labor law case, concerning the scope of labor rights in the United States.

Facts
The union, Local No 627 of the International Union of Operating Engineers claimed that the South Prairie Construction Co and Peter Kiewit Sons' Co were both a single employer, and that they were committing an unfair labor practice under the National Labor Relations Act 1935 §8(a)(5) by refusing to apply a collective agreement to them. The union was already the representative of the bargaining unit.

The Administrative law judge held that the firms were one employer. The National Labor Relations Board held that South Prairie Co and Kiewit Co were separate employers. The Court of Appeals, DC Circuit, decided the firms were a single employer, reversing the NLRB decision under Radio and Television Broadcast Technicians Local Union 1264 v. Broadcast Service [1965] USSC 51, 380 U.S. 255 (1965).

Judgment
The Supreme Court found that the DC Circuit had legitimately identified two corporations as a single employer given that they had a "very substantial qualitative degree of centralized control of labor", but that further determination of the relevant bargaining unit should have been remitted to the NLRB.

See also

United States labor law

Notes

External links
 

United States labor case law
1976 in United States case law
United States Supreme Court cases
United States Supreme Court cases of the Burger Court